The MacDonald Brothers, now performing as The Macs, are a Scottish pop folk duo from Ayr, South Ayrshire, Scotland, consisting of brothers Brian and Craig MacDonald. They first rose to prominence in the third UK series of television talent show The X Factor in 2006, and have since gone on to release four studio albums. Their debut studio album, self-titled The MacDonald Brothers was released in April 2007 to positive reviews. The album went on to top the charts in their native Scotland and also performed well on the UK Albums Chart, peaking at number 18.

The success of their debut album was followed up the same year with their second studio album, The World Outside which was released in October 2007. Whilst performing well in the charts, it did not meet the success of their debut effort, with The World Outside peaking at number two on the Scottish Album Charts and just missing a place in the top forty of the UK Album Charts, peaking at number forty-one there. A further two albums followed in 2008, With Love failed to make a chart appearance on the UK Album Charts but did peak at number twenty two in Scotland, and their most recent album Young Celts, debuting at number one hundred and twelve in the United Kingdom and number eight in Scotland, their first top ten appearance in the Scottish Album Charts since The World Outside.

The brothers are currently signed to Evosound, Hong Kong under their new name "The Macs" but remain living in Scotland. As well as singing, both Craig and Brian play a range of instruments including the violin, accordion, guitar and piano. Their fifth studio album, and first album under their new stage name The Macs, Strumming To Your Beat, was released in December 2013.

Music career

The X Factor (2006–2007)

The MacDonald Brothers auditioned for The X Factor in 2006 in Glasgow, Scotland singing "Don't Worry Baby" originally by The Beach Boys, and the judges comments were positive, with Sharon Osbourne saying "You made that song not sound Californian, you made it sound Scottish ..." and Louis Walsh added "Which Was Good!". The band received three positive votes from the judges Simon Cowell, Osbourne and Walsh. Throughout the show, the boys were mentored and coached by Walsh.

The brothers finished in fourth place, with Leona Lewis being the eventual winner. The Macdonald Brothers signed a recording contract with Syco Records, along with Sony Music Entertainment. Following this they signed with Scottish Independent label "The Music Kitchen" who released their debut album.

The MacDonald Brothers (2007–2008) 
After The X Factor, the band recorded their debut album, The MacDonald Brothers, which was released on 2 April 2007, produced by Stuart Wood of Scottish super group The Bay City Rollers. The album entered the UK Album Charts at No. 18. The album also charted at No. 1 on the Scottish Albums Chart outselling the likes of Kings of Leon and The Proclaimers on their week of release in Scotland. The album consisted mainly of covers including "Real Gone Kid", "Shang-A-Lang", "When You Say Nothing at All" and "Bye Bye Baby" and "500 Miles".

This album was later released by BIG-JOKE records in conjunction with Sony BMG Australia for the Australasian market in 2009.

The World Outside and With Love (2008–2009)
Their second album, The World Outside was released on 15 October 2007 and included a few of the Macs own songs as well as a track "Runaway (Do You Love Me)" written and given to them by Sir Elton John.. The album peaked at No. 41 on the UK chart. It entered the Scottish album charts at No. 2, just being pipped to the post by the "Stereophonics" on the week of release.

The Great Big Scottish Songbook was released on 26 May 2008 by EMI and featured a few of The MacDonald Bros tracks as well as some of Scotland's most well known artists including KT Tunstall, The Proclaimers, Simple Minds and Runrig.

"Runaway (Do You Love Me)" was released as a download single, which was written by Elton John. Their third studio album, With Love was released on 18 February 2008, as a limited edition album for mothers day. It featured many love songs including "Wonderful Tonight" and "Unchained Melody." The limited copies of the album sold out within the first two weeks. The same year, they released their fourth studio album entitled Young Celts was released on 13 October 2008 which saw the Macs return to their Scottish roots featuring tracks such as "Loch Lomond" and "Flower of Scotland," as well as some well known covers such as "So Young," by the Corrs. "You Can Always Come Home Son" was released as a download single. The album, distributed only in Scotland peaked at No. 8.

Strumming To Your Beat and The Macs (2010–present)
The MacDonald Bros recorded a Christmas album in the summer of 2010 which featured nineteen songs which included Christmas songs such as Rockin' Around The Christmas Tree Last Christmas and Merry Christmas Everyone. Originally it was recorded to go on sale exclusively during their "X-MAS" tour Through November and December 2010, however the album was eventually released through digital download format only.

In recent years, the band has been performing under the new stage name as "The Macs" as opposed to their former name of The MacDonald Brothers. Their first album as The Macs, but fifth studio album overall, Strumming To Your Beat was released in 2012 through the EvoSound record label. The band travelled to Nashville to record the album and worked with some of Nashvilles biggest recording producers. Their sixth studio album has been released, The Celtic Collection, which is a collection of Scottish Celtic songs.

Concert tours

X Factor Live 2007
In 2007, "The MacDonald Bros" appeared in some of the UK's largest arenas along with other X Factor contestants on The X Factor Live tour. They closed the first half of the show with their most popular performances from the show, "Shang A Lang," "Cant Take My Eyes Off You," and "500 Miles."

Westlife tours (2007–2011)
Immediately after X FACTOR arena tour the Macs were delighted to be asked to support Irish superstars Westlife on their "Love" tour of the UK picking up the Scottish dates in Glasgow's SECC and Aberdeen Exhibition Centre.
In 2008 the MacDonald Bros toured the length and breath of the UK in support of Westlife which saw them hit every major area in the UK.
In 2010 the Macs were invited to support Irish superstars Westlife for their Scottish dates in Glasgow SECC and in 2011 the brothers supported Westlife at Cawdor Castle, Inverness alongside girband "Wonderland."

Band members
 Brian MacDonald – Vocals, Guitar, Piano, Accordion
 Craig MacDonald – Vocals, Violin

Discography

Studio albums

Singles
 "You Can Always Come Home Son" (2009)
 "Runaway (Do You Love Me)" (2008)

References

External links
 

Scottish pop singers
Scottish rock singers
Scottish pop music groups
21st-century Scottish male singers
Sibling duos
The X Factor (British TV series) contestants